Moutheater is an American rock band from Virginia, primarily composed of drummer/recording engineer Tim Gault and songwriter/multi-instrumentalist Andrew Aircraft. After recording their first 7" with influential engineer Steve Albini during the summer of 2007, the band then began the task of recording the rest of their discography themselves at Tim's Double O Recording.

With a sometimes rotating cast of bass players and other musicians, the band has recorded two full lengths, several ep's, and toured the eastern half of the US multiple times.

Their first full length, Ornament, was released in July 2009, and was featured in Alternative Press, Decibel, and Outburn, as well as other outlets.

After spending a year in the studio throughout 2013 and 2014, and dubbing themselves "Kozmic Noise Rock Flower Sludge", their latest effort, Passing Key, is a culmination of subtle psychedelic influences and their usual early 1990s alternative bedrock, combined with their unique brand of pop-song structured, heavy, noise-rock.

Influences
Moutheater have cited various influences including Nirvana (band), Swans (band), The Melvins, The Jesus Lizard, Godflesh, Neurosis (band), Scratch Acid, Tad (band), Helmet (band), Failure (band), Cursed (band), The Smashing Pumpkins, Queens of The Stone Age, and His Hero Is Gone.

Discography

 Lot Lizard (2007, 7", Thrashed Records)
 No Ballet (2007, CS/CDr, Swim Harder Cassettes)
 Vegas/Moutheater split (2008, 7", Thrashed Records)
 Thrashed Records Vol. 1 Compilation (2008, CS, Thrashed Records, contributed the song Signs Of Weakness)
 Ornament (2009, CD, Thrashed Records; 2012, LP, Head2Wall Records)
 Colonial (2011, 12", Last Anthem Records)
 Passing Key (2014, LP, Anthems of The Undesirable)

Current members

 Andrew Aircraft - Guitar/Vocals (2007–present)
 Tim Gault - Drums (2007–present)
 Chris Matthews - Bass/Guitar (2014–present)
 Seth McPherson - Bass (2016–present)

Former members

 Brett Mathews - Bass (2009–2010)
 Jeb Black - Bass (2010–2011)
 Aaron F. - Bass (2007-2009), (2012–2014)
 J. Chapman - Bass (2011-2012), Guitar (2012-2014)

References
 Sound cover and feature article
 Halifax collect review
 Sound article
 Aversion Online review of Lot Lizard
 Aversion Online review of the Vegas/Moutheater split
 TCC Times article page 1
 TCC Times article page 2
 TCC Times article page 3
 Portfolio Weekly article

External links
 Moutheater Bandcamp

Musical groups from Virginia

mk:Шаблон:Музичка група-никулец